The 2018–19 Polish Cup was the sixty-fifth season of the annual Polish football knockout tournament. It began on 7 August 2018 with the first matches of the preliminary round and ended on 2 May 2019 with the final at PGE Narodowy. Winners of the competition would qualify for the qualifying round of the 2019–20 UEFA Europa League, however eventual winners Lechia Gdańsk had qualified for Europe through their league performance.

Format changes
Before the start of the 2018–19 season, the PZPN confirmed the reforming plan of the Polish Cup, introducing several changes:
 draws would be carried out separately before the start of each round,
 the rule where two of the best teams of the previous season could not be in the same draw before the semi-finals was abandoned,
 introduction of the four teams representing Poland in European competitions in the draw of the round of 64,
 the second leg matches in the quarter-finals and semi-finals had been canceled (the winner of the pair in each round met after a single match),
 Ekstraklasa teams started the game one round earlier than before (in the round of 64 instead of the round of 32),
 teams from places 13 to 18 in the I liga and teams from places 1 to 10 in the II liga as well as cup winners at the provincial level start the game one round later than before (in the round of 64 final instead of the preliminary round),
 the host of the match between teams from the same league level was randomly selected as the first in a given pair (previously an additional draw of the host of the first or only match), except for the round of 64 for teams playing in European competitions.

Participating teams

Prize money
The PZPN Board of Directors determined the size of the prizes at its meeting on May 23, 2018.

Round and draw dates

Preliminary round 
Participating in this round were 8 teams from the 2017–18 II liga from positions 11 to 18. Teams from places 11 to 14 faced teams from places 15 to 18 in the following pairs: 11–18, 12–17, 13–16, 14–15. The matches were played on 7 and 8 August 2018. The number in brackets indicates what tier of Polish football each team competes in during the 2018–19 season.

! colspan="3" style="background:cornsilk;"|7 August 2018

|-
! colspan="3" style="background:cornsilk;"|8 August 2018

|}

Bracket

Round of 64 
The draw for this round was conducted in the headquarter of PZPN on 10 August 2018. The matches was played on 25 to 27 September and 2 to 3 October 2018. Participating in this round were the 4 winners from the previous round, 16 teams from the 2017–18 Ekstraklasa, 18 teams from the 2017–18 I liga, 10 highest ranked teams from 2017–18 II liga and 16 winners of the regional cup competitions. Games were hosted by teams playing in the lower division in the 2018–19 season.

! colspan="3" style="background:cornsilk;"|25 September 2018

|-
! colspan="3" style="background:cornsilk;"|26 September 2018

|-
! colspan="3" style="background:cornsilk;"|27 September 2018

|-
! colspan="3" style="background:cornsilk;"|2 October 2018

|-
! colspan="3" style="background:cornsilk;"|3 October 2018

|}

Round of 32 
The draw for this round was conducted in the headquarter of PZPN on 28 September 2018. The matches were played on 30–31 October and 7 November 2018. Games were hosted by teams playing in the lower division in the 2018–19 season.

! colspan="3" style="background:cornsilk;"|30 October 2018

|-
! colspan="3" style="background:cornsilk;"|31 October 2018

|-
! colspan="3" style="background:cornsilk;"|7 November 2018

|}

Round of 16 
The draw for this round was conducted in the headquarter of PZPN on 8 November 2018. The matches were played on 4 to 6 December 2018.

! colspan="3" style="background:cornsilk;"|4 December 2018

|-
! colspan="3" style="background:cornsilk;"|'5 December 2018

|-
! colspan="3" style="background:cornsilk;"|6 December 2018

|}

Quarter-finals
The 8 winners from Round of 16 competed in this round. The matches were played on 27 February 2019, as well as 12 to 13 March. The draw for this round was conducted in the headquarter of PZPN, Warsaw on 7 December 2018.

! colspan="3" style="background:cornsilk;"|27 February 2019

|-
! colspan="3" style="background:cornsilk;"|12 March 2019

|-
! colspan="3" style="background:cornsilk;"|13 March 2019

|-
! colspan="3" style="background:cornsilk;"|14 March 2019

|}

Semi-finals

! colspan="3" style="background:cornsilk;"|9 April 2019

|-
! colspan="3" style="background:cornsilk;"|10 April 2019

|}

Final

References

Polish Cup
Cup
Polish Cup seasons